Mario Nicolás Abenza (born 19 February 1996) is a Spanish professional footballer who plays as a central midfielder for Real Murcia.

Club career
Abenza was born in Murcia, and joined UD Almería's youth setup in 2013. He made his senior debut with the reserves on 16 November 2014, coming on as a second-half substitute for Míchel Zabaco in a 1–0 Segunda División B away win against Real Betis B.

Abenza scored his first senior goal on 2 January 2017, netting the winner in a 2–1 win at CD Alhaurino in the Tercera División. On 10 July, he was loaned to Real Balompédica Linense of the third division for a year.

On 18 October 2018, Abenza made his professional debut with Almería's first team, replacing José Corpas in a 3–1 home win against CF Reus Deportiu in the season's Copa del Rey. The following 17 July, he was loaned to third division side Atlético Sanluqueño CF for the season.

On 8 September 2020, Abenza signed for Real Murcia of the third tier, after terminating his contract with the Rojiblancos.

References

External links

1996 births
Living people
Spanish footballers
Footballers from Murcia
Association football midfielders
Segunda División B players
Tercera División players
UD Almería B players
Real Balompédica Linense footballers
UD Almería players
Atlético Sanluqueño CF players
Real Murcia players